The Kincardine and Deeside by-election was a parliamentary election held in Kincardine and Deeside, Scotland, on 7 November 1991, caused by the death of the Conservative Member of Parliament, Alick Buchanan-Smith on 29 August 1991.

The result was a Liberal Democrat gain from the Conservatives, with Nicol Stephen elected as the new MP. Stephen held the seat until the 1992 general election when it was regained by the Conservatives. The Labour candidate, Malcolm Savidge, who finished in fourth place at this by-election, went on to be elected as the MP for Aberdeen North at the 1997 general election. Nicol Stephen was elected as Member of the Scottish Parliament for Aberdeen South in 1999 and became Leader of the Scottish Liberal Democrats in 2005.

It was held on the same day as a by-election in Langbaurgh, which the Conservatives also lost.

Results

Previous result

References

External links
Campaign literature from the by-election

1991 in Scotland
1990s elections in Scotland
Politics of Aberdeenshire
1991 elections in the United Kingdom
By-elections to the Parliament of the United Kingdom in Scottish constituencies
20th century in Aberdeenshire